Rabbis for Human Rights is an Israeli human rights organization that describes itself as "the rabbinic voice of conscience in Israel, giving voice to the Jewish tradition of human rights".

Their membership includes Reform, Orthodox, Conservative and Reconstructionist rabbis and students. According to their web site, the organization includes "over one hundred ordained rabbis and rabbinical students".

The organization received the Niwano Peace Prize in 2006.

Organization 
The organization was founded in 1988. Its membership consists of Israeli rabbis and rabbinical students.  RHR has a nineteen-member board of directors. Rabbi Arik Ascherman served as co-director of Rabbis For Human Rights, becoming executive director in 1998. Ayala Levi took over as executive director in 2010. In the past, the organization received funds from the EU, UK and Spain.

Activities
RHR is best known for dispatching volunteers to act as human shields to protect the Palestinian olive harvest from vandalism and assault by settlers living on nearby land; every year, clashes are reported between settlers and Palestinian farmers. In 2008, the volunteer effort encompassed 40 villages. The effort was launched in 2002 when a Palestinian peace activist solicited RHR's help to protect olive pickers against attacks by settlers living near the village of Yanun.

RHR opposes the construction of the Israeli West Bank barrier in any place where it entails the expropriation of Arab-owned land, the division of villages, or cutting farmers off from their fields. RHR achieved a major victory in 2006 when it won a lawsuit to prevent the division by the fence of the village of Sheikh Sa'ad.

In December 2004, RHR executive director Rabbi Arik Ascherman was among three defendants on trial in Jerusalem for standing in front of bulldozers in an effort to block the demolition of Palestinian homes in East Jerusalem. He was charged with "interfering with police performance of duties on two occasions in 2003, and the intention to commit acts to prevent police from performing their duties." In March 2005, a magistrate court ruled Ascherman guilty, but said that he wouldn't have a criminal record.

A movie produced in 2013 by RHR, Fiddler with No Roof, compares the Prawer Plan to Jews' expulsion during the antisemitic Tsarist regime.

Durban UN Anti-Racism conferences
David Bedein from Independent Media Review Analysis has criticized RHR, accusing it of joining "forces with the PLO to support the idea that Israel, was indeed, an apartheid, racist regime" at the 2001 UN Anti-Racism conference in Durban, South Africa. Rabbi Ascherman strongly denies this account, saying: "I want to clarify that RHR’s representative at Durban, Rabbi Jeremy Milgrom, actively voiced our criticism of the inflammatory rhetoric and Israel-bashing".

Rabbi Ascherman and RHR also expressed concern about the second Durban conference, saying "that Israel has committed human rights violations [is an issue that] can appropriately be discussed at a conference like this. But if you allow the conference to be hijacked as if Israel is the only place in the world where there are issues of racism and human rights, then it makes a farce of the whole thing. We're not trying to protect Israel from being criticized, but as people who are really concerned with human rights and racism, and think it is important that there be a body among the community of nations dealing with these things, we don't want to see another hijacking."

Notes

External links
 Official RHR Site
 Peace, Propaganda and the Promised Land: Media & the Israel-Palestine Conflict, documentary directed by Sut Jhally and Bathsheba Ratzkoff (2003) quotes Rabbi Arik Ascherman
 VIDEO: Rabbi Arik Ascherman – Rabbis for Human Rights, talk at the Neveh Shalom Synagogue in Portland, Oregon, on May 5, 2003.

Human rights organizations based in Israel
Non-profit organizations based in Israel
Jewish anti-occupation groups
Non-governmental organizations involved in the Israeli–Palestinian conflict
Rabbinical organizations
Religious activism